Good Morning Pilipinas is a flagship morning magazine television show aired on PTV, which was aired from May 1, 2000, to March 30, 2001, and was replaced by New Day @ PTV. and from January 14, 2013, to May 5, 2017, replacing Metro One and was replaced by Daily Info and Bagong Pilipinas.

It is aired weekdays from 7 to 8 a.m. (UTC +8), after RadyoBisyon.

The show is formerly known as Good Morning Boss during Aquino administration. It is silently rebranded into its present title on July 11, 2016, retaining its current presenters and production team, it premiered in 2000 and originally hosted by Mandy Ochoa, Tina Pamintuan and Candace Giron.

Good Morning Pilipinas air their last broadcast on May 5, 2017, to make way for Daily Info.

Final hosts
 Audrey Gorriceta (2014–2017)
 Dianne Medina (2013–2017)
 Karla Paderna (2014–2017)
 Aljo Bendijo (2015–2017)
 Jules Guiang (2013–2017)
 Diane Querrer (2016–2017)

Former hosts
As Good Morning Pilipinas
 Mandy Ochoa (2000-2001)
 Nikka Cleofe-Alejar (2000-2001)
 Tina Pamintuan (2000-2001)
 Candace Giron (2000-2001)
 Mymy Davao (2000-2001)
 Lala Roque (2000-2001)

As Good Morning Boss
 Freddie Abando (2013-2014)
 Toni Hipolito (2013)
 Catherine Vital (2013)
 Kirby Cristobal (2013-2014)
 Bryan Hafalla as Angas (2013-2014)
 Carla Lizardo (2013-2014)
 Jade Miguel (2014)
 Sandro Hermoso (2013-2014)
 Hazel Ann Salubon (2013-2014)
 Julius Disamburun (2014)

Final segments
 Balitang Trending
 On the Spot
 Usapang SSS
 Mang Tanong
 At Your Service
 School Hopping
 Lifestyle
 Eat's Fun
 Atbp.
 ASEAN TV
 Dermaesthetique
 Reel Talk
 Entrepinoy
 Fifi of Fortune
 Traffic Update
 Price Watch
 I Love My Culture
 Special Feature
 Just 4 Kids
 Artsy Craftsy

Awards
Nominee, Best Morning Show, PMPC Star Awards for TV 2013 & 2014
2014 Anak TV Seal Award

See also
 List of programs aired by People's Television Network

People's Television Network original programming
Philippine television news shows
Breakfast television in the Philippines
Filipino-language television shows
2000 Philippine television series debuts
2001 Philippine television series endings
2013 Philippine television series debuts
2017 Philippine television series endings